Sayf al-Din al-Amidi or Muhammad al-Amidi (b. 1156; Diyarbakır - d. 1233 in Damascus) was an influential jurist. Initially a Hanbalite, Al-Amidi belonged to the Shafi`i school and worked to combine kalam (theology) with existing methods of jurisprudence.

Personal life and education
Al-Amidi was born in Āmid (Diyarbakır) and studied Shafi'i law in his village, according to al-Qifṭī. While some sources claim that he is an Arab from the tribe of Taghlib, some claim that he was Kurdish. He later traveled to Baghdad to join the learning circle of the famous Shafi teacher Ibn Fadlan. In Baghdad al-Amidi focused his studies on theoretical jurisprudence and he transferred from the Shafi school to the Hanbali school. Along with the influence of Ibn Fadlan al-Amidi was prompted to join the Shafi school due to his interest in Ash’ari theology. While in Baghdad al-Amidi also studied philosophy from a Christian tutor. He received much criticism for his studies since philosophy was not in favor with Muslim scholars of the time. He moved to Syria in search of a more hospitable environment but continued on to Egypt after encountering the same difficulties. Al-Amidi rose to fame in Egypt yet attempts by his peers to vilify him because of his use of heretical, rationalist, methods prompted him to move once more. He moved to Damascus where he produced his most famous works on Islamic jurisprudence Al-ihkam fi usul al-ahkam (the Inkam) and the Muntaha. He remained in Syria until his death.

Interest in Philosophy
He was accused of heresy because of his interest in philosophy. In one case Al-Amidi defended philosophical doctrine against the criticism of well known Ash’ari theologian Fakhr al-Din al Razi. He also had interest in pre-theoretic belief, creating A Treatise on the Division of Theoretical Scholarship, to explain the difference between pre-theoretic and theoretic belief.

Writings
al-Amidi believed that an expression was amm (universal) if it was “a single vocable that signifies two or more referents simultaneously”. An objection to this teaching was that it implied at least two affected by the injunction, which created doubt about how the injunction would apply to a single person.

al-Amidi defined ijtihad as the “total expenditure of effort in search for an opinion as to any legal rule in such a manner that the individual senses (within himself)an inability to expend further effort”. His work, A Treatise on Book Titles, he writes on existence, and how time and place are associated with existence. al-Amidi also wrote about linguistics. On Substantiation Through Transitive Relations discusses figurative speech in the first two sections. The second section talks about analogies and transitive relations. The last section covers existence. A copy of this, and at least three of al-Amidi's works were re-published in 1805 by an unknown publisher. They are held in the collection of the Bašagić Collection of Islamic Manuscripts at the University Library in Bratislava.

His most famous work is  Al-ihkam fi usul al-ahkam on usul al-fiqh.

See also
 Ibn 'Abd as-Salam

Further reading
Sayf al-Din al-Amidi, An Essay on Statements in Logic
 Bernard G. Weiss: The Search for God's Law: Islamic Jurisprudence in the Writings of Sayf al-Din al-Amidi. University of Utah Press, revised edition 2010.  (print);  (eBook)

References

Sources
Weiss, Bernard. The search for God's law: Islamic jurisprudence in the writings of Sayf al-Dīn al-Āmidī. Univ of Utah Pr, 1992. Print.
Madelung, W. "Review: [untitled]." Islamic Law and Society 4.1 (1997): 122-125. Web. 16 Feb 2011.
Madelung, W. "Review: [untitled]." Islamic Law and Society 4.1 (1997): 122-125. Web. 16 Feb 2011.
Sherman, Jackson. "Taqlid, Legal Scaffolding and the Scope of Legal Injunctions in the Post-Formative Theory Mutlaq and Amm in the Jurisprudence of Shihab Al-Din Al-Qarafi." Islamic Law and Society (1996): 165-192. Web. 16 Feb 2011.
Weiss, Bernard. "Interpretation in Islamic Law: The Theory of Ijtihad." American Journal of Comparative Law 26.2 (1978): 199-212. Web. 16 Feb 2011.
Esposito, John, Dictionary of Islam (Oxford University Press, 2004) 

Shafi'i fiqh scholars
Asharis
1233 deaths
Year of birth unknown
1156 births
12th-century jurists
13th-century jurists